Endstufe ("final stage") is a German far-right rock band from Bremen.

Formed in the early 1980s, it was one of the first skinhead bands in Germany and since the beginning of 2001 is the longest-running German rechtsrock or skinhead band.

History 
The band was formed in 1981 by the band's singer and frontman Jens Brandt.

Discography

Albums 
 Gruß an Deutschland (MC, Eigenvertrieb, 1984)
 A Way of Life (MC, Eigenvertrieb, 1986) (contains the complete MC Gruß an Deutschland and some new recordings)
 Der Clou (LP/CD, Rock-O-Rama, 1987) — "indexed" as harmful to young persons
 Skinhead Rock'N'Roll (LP/CD, Rock-O-Rama, 1990) — indexed as harmful to young persons
 Allzeit bereit (split with Volksgemurmel) (LP/CD, Rock-O-Rama, 1990) — indexed as harmful to young persons and confiscated
 Glatzenparty (Doppel LP/CD, Rock-O-Rama, 1993)
 Schütze deine Kinder (CD, Rock-O-Rama, 1994)
 Raritäten 1983–1994 (CD, Rock-O-Rama, 1994) — indexed as harmful to young persons
 Der Tod ist überall (CD, Hanse Records, 1996), (LP, Dim Records, 2006)
 Live auf Mallorca '98 (CD, Hanse Records, 1998)
 9698 (CD, Hanse Records, 1999)
 Mit den Jungs auf Tour (CD, Hanse Records, 2000)
 Feuer Frei (LP/CD, Dim Records, 2006)
 Wir sind keine Engel (split CD with Last Riot) (Dim Records, 2007)
 Live (Wo wir sind brennt die Luft) (CD, Pure Impact Records, 2009)
 Steht auf! (CD, Pure Impact Records, 2013)

Singles/MCD 
 Deutschland, wir stehen zu Dir (tätoowiert, kahl, brutal) (7", Rock-O-Rama, 1990)
 Schenk noch einen ein (Deutschland, wir stehn zu dir) (7", Rock-O-Rama, 1990)
 Die Welt gehörte uns (MCD, Rock-O-Rama, 1995)
 Auf die Ohren Vol. 1 (split EP with Kampfzone) (7", self-produced, 2007)

References

External links 
 
 

Musical groups established in 1981
1981 establishments in Germany
Neo-Nazi musical groups
Culture in Bremen (city)
German rock music groups